George Lorimer may refer to:
 George Lorimer (rugby) (1872–1897), English rugby league footballer
 George Horace Lorimer (1867–1937), American journalist and author
 George Huntly Lorimer (born 1942), Professor of Chemistry at the University of Maryland
 George C. Lorimer (1838–1904), American pastor